Oluf Rygh (5 September 1833 – 19 August 1899) was a noted Norwegian archaeologist, philologist and historian. Oluf Rygh is recognized as one of the founders of professional archaeology in Norway. He led the  1867 excavation of the Tune ship (Tuneskipet)

Background
Oluf Rygh was born in Verdal  in Trøndelag, Norway. His parents were Peder Strand Rygh (1800–1868) and Ingeborg Marie Bentsen (1809–1878). He was the older brother of banker  Evald Rygh (1842–1913) and member of Parliament Karl Ditlev Rygh (1839–1915) . Oluf Rygh attended the Trondhjem Cathedral School in 1850 and went to the University of Christiania to study philology, where he graduated in 1856. In 1858, while a teacher at Nissens Skole in Christiania, he was a research fellow for history. Later he was a professor of classical philology, history and Scandinavian languages.

Career

Rygh was professor of history at the Royal Frederick University (now University of Oslo) between 1866 and 1875. He was director of Oldsaksamlingen (which subsequently became the Museum of Cultural History) from 1862 and professor of Nordic archaeology from 1875 – the first professor of archaeology at any Scandinavian university. He led excavation of the Tune ship 1867. His work about Norwegian antiquities Norske Oldsaker (1885)  is recognized for its detailed illustrations and even today is still a significant reference source.

From 1879 to 1899 he chaired the Norwegian Historical Association.

Oluf Rygh is best known for creation of a registry of Norwegian  farm names  Norske Gaardnavne  which is a 19 volume set of books based on a manuscript prepared from 1897 to 1924. The book contains a standardized notation, information on pronunciation, historical forms and the etymology for recorded farm, estate and manor names in Norway, which became the standard for place names in Norway. It inspired similar research in Sweden and Denmark. Rygh died in 1899 at Ulefoss in Holla, Telemark. At the time of his death, only three and one half volumes had been published.

Legacy
The street Oluf Ryghs gate at Fagerborg has been named after him.

Bibliography 
His more significant publications include: 
1869 – Om den ældre Jernalder i Norge (On the Older Iron Age in Norway) 
1877 – Om den yngre Jernalder i Norge (On the Younger Iron Age in Norway) 
1885 – Norske Oldsaker (Norwegian Antiquities)
1897 – Norske Gaardnavne (a 19 volume set on "Norwegian Farm Names" parts of which were completed for publication after his death by other researchers)

References

1833 births
1899 deaths
Archaeologists from Oslo
19th-century Norwegian historians
Old Norse studies scholars
People from Verdal
Academic staff of the University of Oslo
People educated at the Trondheim Cathedral School